The 2007–08 Welsh Premier Division or 2007–08 Principality Premiership for sponsorship reasons was the sixteenth Welsh Premier Division. The season began on Saturday 1 September 2007 and ended on Wednesday 7 May 2008. Fourteen teams played each other on a home and away basis. This was also the first season where teams earned four points for a win and two points for a draw as well as a bonus point for scoring four or more tries in a match. The losing team also earned a bonus point if they lost by seven points or less.

Stadiums

1,500 of them are seats

Table

Fixtures & results

Matchday 1

Matchday 2

Matchday 3

Matchday 4

Matchday 5

Matchday 6

Matchday 7

Matchday 8

Matchday 9

Matchday 10

Matchday 11 (3/7)

Matchday 12

Matchday 13

Matchday 14

Matchday 15

Matchday 16 (6/7)

Matchday 17 (1/7)

Matchday 18

Matchday 17 (2/7)

Matchday 19

Matchday 11 (4/7)

Matchday 17 (3/7)

Matchday 20 (6/7)

Matchday 21

Matchday 22 (1/7)

Matchday 23 (6/7)

Matchday 22 (3/7)

Mixed matchdays

Mixed matchdays

Matchday 24

Matchday 16 (7/7)

Matchday 11 (5/7)

Matchday 25

Matchday 26 (3/7)

Mixed matchdays

Mixed matchdays

Mixed matchdays

Matchday 26 (7/7)

Welsh Premier Division seasons
2007–08 in Welsh rugby union
Wales